Holy Mackerel may refer to:

The Holy Mackerel, a 1968 band featuring Paul Williams
The Holy Mackerel, a 1990s band fronted by Les Claypool
The Holy Mackerel, a brass fish sculpture in the Massachusetts State House Senate chamber; see Sacred Cod

See also
"Hey Hey Holy Mackerel", a 1969 Chicago Cubs fight song, written by Johnny Frigo

Interjections